Vestre Bjonevatnet is a small lake in Norway. The  lake is located primarily in Ringerike Municipality in Viken county and the far northern tip of the lake stretches across the border into Søndre Land Municipality and Gran Municipality in Innlandet county. The lake is situated between the lakes Sperillen and Randsfjorden.

See also
List of lakes in Norway

References

Lakes of Innlandet
Lakes of Viken (county)
Søndre Land
Gran, Norway
Ringerike (municipality)